The 2012 CSL All-Stars Game was the 6th CSL All-Stars Game, an annual football match contested by the winners of the Super League and a team of the CSL top players from other clubs. The match was played at the Tianhe Stadium on 7 November 2012, and contested by league winner Guangzhou Evergrande and CSL All-Stars Team. All-Stars Team won the match 1–0.

2012 CSL All-Star Team

Squad
The squad for All-Stars Game announced on 29 October 2012.

 note 1: Replace Cristian Dănălache.
 note 2: Replace Hao Junmin.

Coaching staff

Match details 

Assistant referees:
 Su Jige 
 Mu Yuxin

Fourth official:
Fan Qi

Referees Assesor:
Chen Yongliang

Match Commissioner:
Xie Zhiguang

General Coordinator
Liu Dianqiu

See also 
2012 Chinese Super League
2012 Guangzhou Evergrande F.C. season

References 

CSL All-Star Game
CSL All-Star Game